Dehnow-e-Kuhestan (also Romanized as Dehnow-e-Kūhestan, Dehnow Koohestan, and Deh Now-ye Kūhestān; also known as Deh-e Now and Deh Now) is a village in Kuhestan Rural District, Jazmurian District, Rudbar-e Jonubi County, Kerman Province, Iran. At the 2006 census, its population was 151, in 38 families.

References 

Populated places in Rudbar-e Jonubi County